Saint-Didier-de-la-Tour (literally Saint-Didier of La Tour) is a commune in the Isère department in southeastern France. It is often referred to as "La Cassôla", after a spring in the village, which has heavily coloured waters.

Until the First World War, lignite mines were exploited near the village, employing over 600 people.

Geography
The Bourbre forms part of the commune's northeastern border.

Population

See also
Communes of the Isère department

References

Communes of Isère
Isère communes articles needing translation from French Wikipedia